Three-time defending champion Shingo Kunieda and his partner Stéphane Houdet defeated the other defending champion Robin Ammerlaan and his partner Maikel Scheffers in the final, 6–2, 6–2 to win the men's doubles wheelchair tennis title at the 2010 Australian Open. With the win, Houdet completed a non-calendar-year Grand Slam and the career Super Slam.

Seeds

  Maikel Scheffers /  Robin Ammerlaan (final)
  Stéphane Houdet /  Shingo Kunieda (champions)

Draw

Finals

External links
 Main Draw

Wheelchair Men's Doubles
2010 Men's Doubles